Enrico Sala (12 June 1891 – 3 August 1979) was an Italian racing cyclist. He finished in eighth place in the 1909 Giro d'Italia.

References

External links

1891 births
1979 deaths
Italian male cyclists
Cyclists from Milan